William Astor may refer to:

 William Backhouse Astor Sr. (1792–1875), American businessman and member of the Astor family
 William Backhouse Astor Jr. (1829–1892), American businessman and son of the above
 William Waldorf Astor (1848–1919), American-born English politician and nephew of the above
 William Astor, 3rd Viscount Astor (1907–1966), English politician and grandson of the above
 William Astor, 4th Viscount Astor (born 1951), English politician and son of the above